The 1997–98 NLA season was the 60th regular season of the Nationalliga A.

Regular season

Final standings

Playoffs

Quarterfinals

Semifinals

Finals

References
sehv.ch
hockeyarchives.info

External links
hockeyfans.ch
eishockeyforum.ch
spoor.ch

1997–98 in Swiss ice hockey
Swiss